The following is a list of mountains in Jamaica:

 Blue Mountain Peak
 Blue Mountains
 John Crow Mountains
 Juan de Bolas Mountain
 Mocho Mountains
 Dry Harbour Mountains
 Dolphin Head Mountains
 Bull Head Mountains
 Santa Cruz Mountains
 Mount Diablo Mountains
 Don Figuerero Mountains
 May Day Mountains
 Yallahs Mountains
 Mount Diablo
 Mount Fuego
 Long Mountain
 Georges Plain Mountain
 John Crow Peak
 Mount Airy
 The Blue Mountain
 Mocho Mountains
 Nassau
 Albion Hill
 Bull Head Mountain

See also
 List of mountain

Jamaica